Regina Rakhimkulova (born 5 November 1979 in Bashkir ASSR, USSR) is a long-distance runner from Russia who specializes in the 5,000 metres. She is a one-time national champion in the women's 5,000 metres.

She finished tenth at the 2006 European Athletics Championships in Gothenburg and twelfth in 3,000 metres at the 2007 European Indoor Championships.

Her twin sister Nadezhda is also a runner.

References 

1979 births
Living people
Sportspeople from Bashkortostan
Russian female long-distance runners
Russian Athletics Championships winners
Russian twins
Twin sportspeople
20th-century Russian women
21st-century Russian women